Mary Anselmo is an American billionaire businesswoman. She is the widow of Rene Anselmo, the founder of PanAmSat, the first privately held satellite communications company in the United States.

Career
Mary's husband Rene Anselmo died in 1995, two days before the initial public offering of his company. For a time, Mary was principal owner of the company, although she had rarely been involved in her husband's business and said in a 1996 interview with The New York Times that she knew little about satellites. When PanAmSat was bought by KKR and other private equity firms in 2004, she received a net $250 million.

She has appeared on multiple occasions on the Forbes magazine list of wealthiest people in the world. According to the magazine's 2008 rankings, her net worth was estimated at $1.1 billion, and her rank was 1,014.

Personal life
She has three children: Reverge C., Pier, and Rayce Anselmo.

References

American billionaires
Female billionaires
Businesspeople from Greenwich, Connecticut
Living people
Year of birth missing (living people)
American women in business